The Spare Room is a 1932 British comedy film directed by Redd Davis and starring Jimmy James, Ruth Taylor, Charles Paton and Alice O'Day. The screenplay concerns a drunken husband, arriving home late, who faces the wrath of his wife and extended family. A featurette, it was shot at Cricklewood Studios as a quota quickie.

Cast
 Jimmy James as	Jimmy
 Ruth Taylor	as Mrs. James
 Charles Paton as Mr. Webster
 Alice O'Day	 as	Mrs. Webster
 Charles Courtneidge as Jones
 Roland Gillett as 	Hiram Harris
 Kathleen Joyce as Rita
 Charles Farrell as Boxer

References

External links

1932 films
1932 comedy films
Films directed by Redd Davis
British comedy films
Quota quickies
Films shot at Cricklewood Studios
British black-and-white films
1930s English-language films
1930s British films